For the 2000 Eurovision Song Contest, the United Kingdom entered "Don't Play That Song Again", performed by Nicki French. It received 28 points and 16th place in Stockholm, Sweden.

Before Eurovision

A Song for Europe 2000 

In 2000, the BBC reverted to the historic A Song for Europe title for the national selection competition, but retained the format from the previous selection show The Great British Song Contest (1996–99). The format consisted of a radio semi-final with eight songs, with the top four songs, selected by televoting, progressing to the televised final.

Semi-final
The semi-final was held on 14 January 2000 on BBC Radio 2, hosted by Terry Wogan and Ken Bruce. Televoting selected the top 4 songs to qualify to the final.

Final
The final was held on 20 February 2000 on BBC One, hosted by Katy Hill at BBC Elstree Studios in Borehamwood. A public televote selected the winner, "Don't Play That Song Again" performed by Nicki French.

At Eurovision
The United Kingdom was the third country to perform on the night of the contest, following Netherlands and preceding Estonia. At the end of the voting, Nicki French scored a total of 28 points from eight countries, finishing in 16th place. At that time, it was the worst placing for the United Kingdom since it first entered the contest, and would remain so until 2003. The United Kingdom televoting awarded its 12 points to contest winners Denmark.

Voting

References

2000
Countries in the Eurovision Song Contest 2000
Eurovision
Eurovision